Elections to the consultative Regional Council (Landesrat) were held in the territory of the Saar Basin on 27 January 1924. The Centre Party remained the largest faction, winning 14 of the 30 seats, but lost its majority. At its first meeting on 6 March, all parties except the Communists affirmed their continued loyalty to Germany. Peter Scheuer of the Centre Party was elected President of the Landesrat on 24 March.

Electoral system
The election was held using the open list system, with each voter able to cast up to 30 votes.

Results

References

Saar
Elections in Saarland
Parliamentary election
Saar